Major-General Sir Herbert Stewart  (30 June 1843 – 16 February 1885) was a British soldier.

Early life

Stewart, the eldest son of the Rev. Edward Stewart, was born at Sparsholt, Hampshire. He was the grandson of Edward Richard Stewart and great-grandson of John Stewart, 7th Earl of Galloway. He played first-class cricket for Hampshire.

Military career
He was educated at Brighton College and then Winchester College before entering the army in 1863. After serving in India with his regiment (37th Foot) he returned to England in 1873, having exchanged into the 3rd Dragoon Guards.  In the year of 1877 he entered the staff college and also the Inner Temple.  In 1878 he was sent to South Africa, served in both the Zulu War and against Sikukuni.  As the chief staff-officer under Sir George Pomeroy Colley, he was present at Majuba (27 February 1881), where he was made prisoner by a Boer patrol and detained until the end of that March.

In August 1882, he was placed on the staff of the cavalry division in Egypt.  After Tel-el-Kebir (13 September 1882), he headed a brilliant advance upon Cairo, taking possession of both the town and citadel.  He was three times mentioned in despatches, and made a brevet-colonel, CB, and aide-de-camp to the Queen.  In January 1884, he was sent to Suakin in command of the cavalry under Sir Gerald Graham, and took part as brigadier in the actions from El Teb to the advance on Tamai.  His services were recognized by him being knighted as a Knight Commander of the Order of the Bath, and he was made assistant adjutant and QMG in the south-eastern district of England from April to September 1884.

He then joined the expedition for the relief of Khartoum, and in that December, when news from Gordon decided Lord Wolseley to send a column across the desert of Metemma, Stewart was entrusted with the command.  On 16 January 1885, he found the enemy in force near the wells of Abu Klea, and brilliantly repulsed their fierce charge on the following morning.  Leaving the wounded under guard, the column moved forward on the 18th through bushy country towards Metemma, 23 miles off.  

Meanwhile, the enemy continued their attacks, and on the morning of the 19th, Stewart was wounded in the Battle of Abu Kru and obliged to hand over the command to Sir Charles Wilson.

He lingered for nearly a month, living long enough to hear of his promotion to the rank of major-general "for distinguished service in the field." He died on the way back from Khartoum to Korti on 16 February, and was buried near the wells of Jakdul.  In the telegram reporting his death, Lord Wolseley summed up both Stewart's character and career with the words: "No braver soldier or more brilliant leader of men ever wore the Queen's uniform."  A similar sentiment was felt by the Chief: "A finer soldier never existed in HM Service.  He was a young officer, who by his own merits and his personal bravery had brought himself into a prominent position in the Army much earlier than usually happened in the ordinary course of events." Stewart seemed to epitomize the selfless spirit of the age, embodying the heroic sacrifice for Queen and Country that was supposed to symbolize a civilized Empire.  A bronze cenotaph was erected in St Paul's Cathedral, London.

References

Bibliography 
 George, HRH Duke of Cambridge, "George, A Memoir of his Private life: based on the journals and correspondence of His Highness" ed. edgar Sheppard, vol.1 (1819-1871), vol.2 (1871-1904), Longmans & Co, 1906.

External links
Cricinfo
Gordon of Khartoum

1843 births
1885 deaths
3rd Dragoon Guards officers
37th Regiment of Foot officers
British Army generals
British Army personnel of the Anglo-Egyptian War
British military personnel killed in the Mahdist War
British Army personnel of the Mahdist War
British Army personnel of the Anglo-Zulu War
Knights Commander of the Order of the Bath
Recipients of the Order of St. Sava
People educated at Brighton College
People from the City of Winchester
English cricketers
Hampshire cricketers
Marylebone Cricket Club cricketers
People educated at Winchester College